Bobby Reynolds and John-Patrick Smith were the defending champions, but Reynolds chose not to participate. Smith partnered with Adam Hubble and lost in the quarterfinals to Alex Kuznetsov and Nils Langer.

Peter Polansky and Adil Shamasdin won the title, defeating Bradley Klahn and Tim Smyczek 7–6(7–0), 6–1 in the final.

Seeds

Draw

Draw

References
 Main Draw

Napa Valley Challenger - Doubles
2014 Doubles
Napa Valley Challenger - Doubles